Natalie Nedd is a Guyanese footballer who plays as a goalkeeper for US college team Graceland Yellowjackets and the Guyana women's national team.

Early life
Nedd was born and raised in Georgetown. She has also lived in Tobago, Trinidad and Tobago, where she has attended both primary and secondary school.

College career
Nedd has attended the Graceland University in Lamoni, Iowa, United States.

Club career
Nedd has played for Fruta Conquerors FC in Guyana.

International career
Nedd capped for Guyana at senior level during the 2018 CONCACAF Women's Championship qualification.

See also
List of Guyana women's international footballers

References

External links

Living people
Guyanese women's footballers
Women's association football goalkeepers
Graceland Yellowjackets women's soccer players
Guyana women's international footballers
Guyanese emigrants to Trinidad and Tobago
Guyanese expatriate footballers
Guyanese expatriate sportspeople in the United States
Expatriate women's soccer players in the United States
Sportspeople from Georgetown, Guyana
Year of birth missing (living people)